The mountain rainbowfish (Melanotaenia monticola) is a species of rainbowfish in the subfamily Melanotaeniinae. It is endemic to Papua New Guinea, where it occurs in the Southern Highlands between Mendi and Lake Kutubu, in the Purari River system.

Sources

Melanotaenia
Freshwater fish of Papua New Guinea
Taxonomy articles created by Polbot
Fish described in 1980